Hanno is a lunar impact crater that lies near the southeastern limb of the Moon, along the western edge of the Mare Australe. About a crater diameter to the southwest is the prominent crater Pontécoulant.

Hanno is a heavily worn crater formation with an outer rim that has been battered and pock-marked by small impacts. A small crater attached to the north-northeastern rim forms a depression in the side. The inner walls are nearly featureless except for a few small craterlets, and the interior floor is likewise level and battered by tiny craters.

The Hanno crater was named after Hanno the Navigator.

Satellite craters
By convention these features are identified on lunar maps by placing the letter on the side of the crater midpoint that is closest to Hanno.

References

External links
A view of Hanno crater

Impact craters on the Moon